Jazzman was a French magazine on the subject of jazz and jazz performance.  Founded in October 1992, it was merged with Jazz Magazine in September, 2009 in response to the worldwide economic downturn and the general loss of revenue among music magazines.  It was advertised as "the magazine for all jazz".

Jazzman began as a free supplement in Le Monde de la musique; it published its first independent number in March 1995.

References
" et Jazz Magazine fusionnent, Muziq s’arrête" , Irma, June 18, 2009.

External links 
 Official web site

1992 establishments in France
2009 disestablishments in France
Defunct magazines published in France
French-language magazines
Music magazines published in France
Jazz magazines
Magazines established in 1992
Magazines disestablished in 2009
Free magazines